The Anhui Provincial Library, also known as the Anhui Library, is a Hefei-based comprehensive provincial-level public library located at No. 74, Wuhu Road, Baohe District, Hefei City in China.

History
The predecessor of the Anhui Provincial Library was the Anhui Province-established Library, which was founded on February 10, 1913. It was set up by a group of culture lovers on their own initiative.

The library was moved several times due to wars, and in December 1962, it was moved to its present location.

References

Libraries in China
Buildings and structures in Anhui
Libraries established in 1913